Althea Latoya Byfield (born 28 November 1982 in Kingston, Jamaica) is a Jamaican international basketball and netball player. Byfield has represented Jamaica in both sports, and is a current member of the Jamaican netball team.

Early life
Althea Byfield was born in Kingston on 28 November 1984, the daughter of Tony Byfield and Jean Rumble. She also has a twin brother, Ian. Byfield attended high school at The Queen's School in Jamaica, and subsequently travelled to the United States to attend Midland Junior College in Texas.

Basketball career
Byfield played basketball at Midland in the 2001–02 Western Junior College Athletic Conference season. In 2002, she transferred to Texas A&M University–Commerce, majoring in kinesiology, but did not play basketball until the 2003–04 season. In that season Byfield started in 16 of 19 games played, averaging 7.1 points and 6.3 rebounds per match; she was also named Lions Newcomer of the year. In the following season, Byfield was the only player in the Lone Star Conference to be ranked in the top ten players for rebounds (3rd), assists (10th) and steals (3rd); she also had the seventh-highest minutes played throughout the LSC season, averaging over 33 minutes per game. The 2005–06 season saw her playing time reduced, somewhat due to a larger playing bench.

Byfield was also part of the Jamaican national women's basketball team selected to compete in the Caribbean Basketball Championships in 2006, and subsequently at the 2007 FIBA Americas Championship for Women. As of October 2008, she was playing for the Metrobelles in the Jamaican National Basketball League.

Netball career
As a member of the Jamaican U21 squad, Byfield won a silver medal at the 2000 Netball World Youth Championships in Cardiff. Later, she was a member of the national squads that participated in the 2003 and 2007 Netball World Championships, with Jamaica winning bronze medals in both tournaments. In 2010, she featured in Jamaica's Commonwealth Games campaign in India and won bronze at the 2010 World Netball Series in England.

In domestic netball, Byfield plays for Jamalco in the Jamaican Netball Association Open League competition, having previously played for Waulgrovians and Blades United. In 2008, Byfield was signed with the Central Pulse in New Zealand for the 2009 ANZ Championship season. She became one of the team's standout players, although the Pulse finished their season in 10th place. Byfield transferred to the Northern Mystics in 2010 as their starting goal keeper. She was not signed for the 2011 season.

References

External links
 2010 ANZ Championship profile

Jamaican netball players
Jamaican women's basketball players
Commonwealth Games competitors for Jamaica
Netball players at the 2010 Commonwealth Games
Northern Mystics players
Central Pulse players
Texas A&M University–Commerce alumni
Sportspeople from Kingston, Jamaica
1982 births
Living people
Jamaican twins
Twin sportspeople
ANZ Championship players
Basketball players at the 2018 Commonwealth Games
Jamaican expatriate netball people in New Zealand
2003 World Netball Championships players
2007 World Netball Championships players
2011 World Netball Championships players